Jimmy McKinnell may refer to:

 Jimmy McKinnell (footballer) (1893–1972), Scottish footballer
 Jimmy McKinnell Sr. (died 1965), manager of Scottish football club Queen of the South
 Jimmy McKinnell Jr. (died 1995), secretary and manager of Queen of the South